Taylor Dent was the defending champion, however he chose to not compete this year.
Kei Nishikori won this tournament. He defeated Robert Kendrick 6–1, 6–4 in the final.

Seeds

Draw

Finals

Top half

Bottom half

References
 Main Draw
 Qualifying Draw

Knoxville Challenger - Singles
2010 Singles